Michael Thornton (1856–??) was a United States Navy sailor and a recipient of the United States military's highest decoration, the Medal of Honor.

Born in 1856 in Ireland, Thornton immigrated to the United States and joined the Navy from Pennsylvania. By August 26, 1881, he was serving as a seaman on the tugboat . On that day, while Leyden was near Boston, Massachusetts, Landsman Michael Drennan jumped overboard because he was "temporarily insane". Thornton jumped in after him and kept him afloat until they could be rescued. For this action, he was awarded the Medal of Honor three years later, on October 18, 1884.

Thornton's official Medal of Honor citation reads:
For jumping overboard from the U.S. Tug Leyden, near Boston, Mass., 26 August 1881, and sustaining until picked up, Michael Drennan, landsman, who had jumped overboard while temporarily insane.

See also

List of Medal of Honor recipients during peacetime

References

External links

1856 births
19th-century Irish people
Irish sailors in the United States Navy
Year of death missing
Irish emigrants to the United States (before 1923)
United States Navy sailors
United States Navy Medal of Honor recipients
Irish-born Medal of Honor recipients
Non-combat recipients of the Medal of Honor